This is a list of winners and nominees of the Primetime Emmy Award for Outstanding Hairstyling for a Limited Series or Movie.

In the following list, the first titles listed in gold are the winners; those not in gold are nominees, which are listed in alphabetical order. The years given are those in which the ceremonies took place:



Winners and nominations

1970s

Outstanding Achievement in Hairstyling

1980s

1990s

2000s

2010s

Programs with multiple wins

3 wins
 American Horror Story

2 wins
 American Crime Story

Programs with multiple nominations

7 nominations
 American Horror Story

2 nominations
 American Crime Story
 Fargo
 Genius
 Into the West

Notes

References

Hairstyling for a Limited Series or Movie
Awards disestablished in 2019
Awards established in 1970
Hairdressing